Alluaudia insignis is a species of beetle in the family Cerambycidae, and the only species in the genus Alluaudia. It was described by Lameere in 1893.

References

Apomecynini
Beetles described in 1893